"Half Past Forever (Till I'm Blue in the Heart)" is a song written by Robert Byrne and Tom Brasfield, and recorded by American country music artist T.G. Sheppard.  It was released in October 1986 as the second single from the album It Still Rains in Memphis.  The song reached #2 on the Billboard Hot Country Singles & Tracks chart.

Charts

Weekly charts

Year-end charts

References

1987 singles
1986 songs
T. G. Sheppard songs
Songs written by Robert Byrne (songwriter)
Columbia Records singles
Songs written by Tom Brasfield